John George II (17 November 1627 – 7 August 1693) was a German prince of the House of Ascania and ruler of the principality of Anhalt-Dessau from 1660 to 1693.

A member of the Fruitbearing Society, he also served as a field marshal of Brandenburg-Prussia.

Life

Early life
John George was born on 17 November 1627 at Dessau, the second (but eldest and only surviving) son of John Casimir, Prince of Anhalt-Dessau, by his first wife Agnes, daughter of Maurice, Landgrave of Hesse-Kassel.

Marriage
In Groningen on 9 September 1659 John George married Henriette Katharina (b. The Hague, 10 February 1637 – d. Schloss Oranienbaum, 3 November 1708), daughter of Frederick Henry, Prince of Orange. The marriage was happy and was even said by some to be a love match. They had ten children.

Reign
After the death of his father on 15 July 1660, John George took over the government of Anhalt-Dessau. He also inherited his family's claim on Aschersleben, which had been controlled by Brandenburg-Prussia since 1648.

John George made his military career in the service of the Prussian army; the Elector Frederick William named him a Generalfeldmarschall in 1670. After France invaded Frederick William's Duchy of Cleves, John George negotiated a treaty in Vienna in June 1672 between Leopold I, Holy Roman Emperor, and Frederick William, by which each pledged to provide 12,000 troops to uphold the borders of the Peace of Westphalia in the face of French aggression. John George was chosen to lead the largely unsuccessful campaign, which led Georg von Derfflinger to temporarily resign in protest.

While campaigning against the French for control of Alsace in 1674, most of Frederick William's army went into winter quarters in Franconian Schweinfurt. As viceroy (Statthalter), John George commanded the troops remaining in Brandenburg. King Louis XIV of France convinced King Charles XI of Sweden to invade Brandenburg; after dispersing John George's small force, the Swedish troops went into winter quarters as well. The Prince of Dessau took part in Frederick William's retaliatory campaign in 1675, which resulted in the Battle of Fehrbellin.

In 1683 John George travelled to Passau, ostensibly to discuss Brandenburg's involvement in the Ottoman wars with the emperor Leopold, although his main aim was to advise against another French war. The prince reaffirmed Brandenburg's alliance with Austria.

Death and succession
Prince John George died in Berlin on 7 August 1693. He was succeeded as prince of Anhalt-Dessau by his eldest surviving son, Leopold.

Issue

References

1627 births
1693 deaths
People from Dessau-Roßlau
German Calvinist and Reformed Christians
Field marshals of Prussia
Princes of Anhalt-Dessau
Military personnel from Saxony-Anhalt